Everybody’s Favourite (note English spelling) is a reissue of the 1963 album by country singer Jimmy Dean of similar name (US spelling) except with two tracks omitted. These were “Mile Long Train” (as side 1, track 1) and “Philosophizin' (as side 2, track 3). The album was released in the UK on the Hallmark Records label in 1967. The original 1963 album was released by Columbia Records. The album covers were the same except for spelling and track listing (1963 cover shown). A single from the album, "This Ole House", reached #128 in the Billboard Hot 100 when first released in 1963.

Track listing

Side 1
"I Really Don't Want to Know" (Howard Barnes, Don Robertson)
"Be Honest With Me" (Gene Autry, Fred Rose)
"(Remember Me) I'm the One Who Loves You" (Stuart Hamblen)
"Time Changes Everything" (Tommy Duncan)
"Sweet Georgia Brown" (Ben Bernie, Maceo Pinkard, Kenneth Casey)

Side 2
"This Ole House" (Stuart Hamblen)
"Tears on My Pillow" (Gene Autry, Fred Rose)
"No One Will Ever Know" (Mel Foree, Fred Rose)
"Hang Your Head in Shame" (Fred Rose, Steve Nelson, Ed G. Nelson)
"Chattanoogie Shoe Shine Boy" (Harry Stone, Jack Stapp)

References

1967 albums
Hallmark Records albums
Jimmy Dean albums